Robert John Halliburton (23 March 193526 September 2004) was an English priest and theologian within the Church of England, who served as a canon and Chancellor of St Paul's Cathedral between 1989 and 2003.

Early life and ordination
Robert John Halliburton was born in March 1935 in Wimbledon, London, the son of Robert Halliburton and Katherine Margery Halliburton (née Robinson). He moved to Kent during the Second World War and was educated at Tonbridge School. He studied for a bachelor's degree at Selwyn College, Cambridge, reading modern languages for Part I of the Tripos but transferring to theology for Part II.

After graduating, he completed his obligatory eighteen months of national service. He then began simultaneously studying for a PhD at Keble College, Oxford and preparing for ordination into the Church of England at St Stephen's House. His PhD thesis, for which he was supervised by Canon F. L. Cross, was entitled "Augustine and the Monastic Life". He was Principal of Chichester Theological College from 1975 to 1982.

Personal life
Halliburton's interests included music and gardening, and he was a member of the Athenaeum Club.

Halliburton married Jennifer Ormsby Turner in 1968. Their marriage produced five children: two sons and three daughters.

He died in September 2004, survived by his wife and three of their children.

References

20th-century English Anglican priests
1935 births
2004 deaths
People educated at Tonbridge School
People from Wimbledon, London
Alumni of Selwyn College, Cambridge
Alumni of Keble College, Oxford
Chancellors of St Paul's Cathedral